Why is an unincorporated rural community in Pima County, Arizona, United States. It lies near the western border of the Tohono Oʼodham Indian Reservation and due north of Organ Pipe Cactus National Monument in Southern Arizona.

The population in Why at the 2010 census was approximately 167.

History
The town derives its name from the fact that two major highways, State Routes 85 and 86, originally intersected in a Y-intersection. At the time of its naming, state law required all city names to have at least three letters, so the town's founders named the town "Why" as opposed to simply calling it "Y."  The Arizona Department of Transportation (ADOT) later removed the old Y-intersection for traffic safety reasons and built the two highways in a conventional intersection south of the original intersection.

It has frequently been noted on lists of unusual place names.

Demographics

See also

Notes

References

 This is the sum of the populations of Blocks 1131–1153, Census Tract 49, Pima County, Arizona according to US Census U.S. Census website.

External links

Unincorporated communities in Pima County, Arizona
Unincorporated communities in Arizona
Tohono O'odham Nation